Sessrumnir Valley is a high, mainly ice-free valley lying east of Mount Freya in the Asgard Range, Victoria Land. The New Zealand Antarctic Place-Names Committee (NZ-APC) approved the name in 1982 from a proposal by G.G.C. Claridge, Soil Bureau, DSIR, New Zealand. One of several names from Norse mythology in Asgard Range; Sessrumnir being the palace of the goddess Freya.

Valleys of Victoria Land
McMurdo Dry Valleys